Claud Muirhead (1782–1872) was an 18th-century Scottish printer and publisher and editor of the Edinburgh Advertiser

Life

He was born on 1 November 1782, the son of James Muirhead (1757–1843) a printer and his wife Anne Cleghorn (1751–1818).

The family only appear in Edinburgh in the early 19th century. His father had a printworks at 91 Rose street (behind Princes Street) and a house at 3 Queensferry Street.

In 1820 he purchased the publication rights of the Advertiser from James Donaldson (the founder of Donaldson's School). He moved the publishing of the paper to his father's printworks at Rose Street. An extra storey was built onto the two storey building at this time.

Immensely rich he was able to purchase both Gogar Park, a large estate west of Edinburgh (now the HQ of the Royal Bank of Scotland) and a house at 7 Heriot Row designed by William Sibbald and Robert Reid.

Not until 1825 does Claud appear independently in registers: living at 21 Heriot Row. His father's printworks on Rose Street is also renamed J & C Muirhead at the same time. On his father's death in 1844 he became sole proprietor of the printworks. By 1850 the "Advertiser" had an additional office at 13 Hanover Street but the printworks remained on Rose Street.

He died in Edinburgh on 28 March 1872 aged 89, and is buried with his parents in St Cuthbert's Churchyard off the west end of Princes Street. The grave lies midway along the southern boundary wall, underneath Edinburgh Castle.

Family

He married Mary Watson (1800–1853)on 6 August 1828.

He was father to the scholar and book collector James Muirhead (b.1830). His son Claud Muirhead MD (1836–1910) gained his MD at the University of Edinburgh in 1862 and is buried in Warriston Cemetery. His son William Muir Muirhead MD (1838–1911) also gained his MD at the University of Edinburgh in 1862. They were educated at Edinburgh Academy.

References

1782 births
1872 deaths
Publishers (people) from Edinburgh
Scottish printers
19th-century British businesspeople